Keith Secola (born 1957) is an Ojibwe-American musician who plays rock and roll, folk rock, and folk. A singer-songwriter, he also plays guitar and flute.

Secola was born in Cook, Minnesota . He is married and has 2 children. In 1982 he graduated from the University of Minnesota with a degree in American Indian Studies.

His band has had the names the Wild Band of Indians, the Wild Javelinas, and Wild Onions. He has contributed songs to documentary films, including Homeland, Patrick's Story and Dodging Bullets. He won "best artist" at the 2006 Native American Music Awards for the album Native Americana. He is perhaps best known for his upbeat, folk rock song, "NDN Kars" from the  film Dance Me Outside. Secola's music was used for the score of the documentary Dodging Bullets—Stories from Survivors of Historical Trauma as the music associates growing up Native.
 
As an activist he has worked with Irene Bedard on environmental and Native American issues.

Discography

Web sources

External links
Keith Secola's Home page

1957 births
Native American musicians
Ojibwe people
Living people
University of Minnesota College of Liberal Arts alumni
American male singer-songwriters
20th-century American singers
20th-century American male singers
21st-century American singers
21st-century American male singers
People from St. Louis County, Minnesota
Don Giovanni Records artists
Singer-songwriters from Minnesota